Ilija Bozoljac was the defending champion, but lost in the first round.

Radu Albot won the title, defeating James Duckworth in the final, 7–6(7–0), 6–1.

Seeds

Draw

Finals

Top half

Bottom half

References
 Main Draw
 Qualifying Draw

Emami Kolkata Open ATP Challenger Tour - Singles